The Philadelphia Wings were one of the original four franchises in the Eagle Pro Box Lacrosse League, joining the New Jersey Saints, Washington Wave, and Baltimore Thunder in 1987. The Wings were still in a growing phase in 1988 and recorded 3 wins and 6 losses that season. Once again, though, the team was able to draw in fans, with a home attendance of 48,910 (over 12,000 per game). Star player Mike French moved upstairs into the Wings' general manager's chair during the year.

Game log
Reference:

(p) - denotes playoff game

1988 Highlights
 The Wings drew more fans at home, 48,910 at the Spectrum, with their largest draw, 16,028 fans in a 12-7 victory against the New Jersey Saints.
 The team was able to acquire the services of Hall of Famers Brad Kotz and Tony Resch during the year.
 Kevin Bilger led the league in Save Percentage at 77.2%.

Roster
Reference:

See also
 Philadelphia Wings
 1988 Eagle Pro Box Lacrosse League season

References

External links
https://web.archive.org/web/20071102134725/http://www.wingszone.com/whistory/history.htm

Philadelphia Wings seasons
Philadelphia Wings
1988 in lacrosse